Kamu de Almeida (died 15 June 2013) was an Angolan diplomat. He was the Ambassador to the Congo, Spain and Egypt.

Death
Almeida died of an illness on 15 June 2013 in Lisbon at the age of 73.

References

2013 deaths
Ambassadors of Angola to Spain
Ambassadors of Angola to the Democratic Republic of the Congo
Ambassadors of Angola to Egypt
Year of birth missing